Beach volleyball at the 2010 Asian Games was held in Guangzhou, Guangdong, China.

Schedule

Medalists

Medal table

Participating nations
A total of 90 athletes from 17 nations competed in beach volleyball at the 2010 Asian Games:

Final standing

Men

Women

References

Men's Beach Volleyball Results
Women's Beach Volleyball Results

External links
Asian Volleyball Confederation

 
2010 Asian Games events
Asian Games
2010